Luís Manuel Magalhães (born 1958) is a Portuguese-Angolan basketball coach. He is a former head coach of the Angola national basketball team. He succeeded Portuguese-Angolan native Alberto Carvalho in 2009, and coached Angola at the FIBA Africa Championship 2009, where the team won its seventh consecutive African championship.

Prior to moving to Angola, Magalhães was one of the best coaches in Portuguese basketball.  He led three teams to the Portuguese Basketball Premier League title - Portugal Telecom (2000–01, 2001–02, 2002–03), FC Porto (2003–04), and Ovarense (2006–07).  He moved to Angolan side Primeiro de Agosto, where he was the head coach from January 2008 to June 2011, winning 12 titles, amidst national and international competitions.

From 2012 to 2013, he has been the head coach of Angolan side Recreativo do Libolo. Since 2019, is the head coach of Sporting CP.

See also 
 List of FIBA AfroBasket winning head coaches

Notes

1958 births
Living people
Portuguese basketball coaches
Portuguese expatriates in Angola